Gianmaria Dal Maistro (born 4 December 1980)  is a visually impaired Italian male paralympic alpine skier who won medals at the Paralympic Games.

References

External links
 

1980 births
Living people
Paralympic alpine skiers of Italy
Paralympic gold medalists for Italy
Paralympic silver medalists for Italy
Paralympic bronze medalists for Italy
Paralympic athletes of Fiamme Azzurre
Paralympic medalists in alpine skiing
Medalists at the 1998 Winter Paralympics
Alpine skiers at the 1998 Winter Paralympics
People from Schio
Sportspeople from the Province of Vicenza